Antonio Hidalgo López is the Undersecretary of the Presidency, Relations with the Courts and Equality of the Spain. He is a high-ranking official of the Ministry of the Presidency of Spain.

References 

Government ministers of Spain
Living people
Year of birth missing (living people)